The  Iowa Barnstormers season was the 13th season for the franchise, and the ninth in the Arena Football League. The team was coached by Mike Hohensee and played their home games at Wells Fargo Arena.

Final roster

Standings

Regular season schedule
The Barnstormers began the season on the road against the Chicago Rush on March 23. Their first home game was April 5 against the Spokane Shock. They closed the regular season against the Arizona Rattlers at home on July 27.

References

Iowa Barnstormers
Iowa Barnstormers seasons
Barn